Sarvādhikārī is a title with diverse uses in India, including:

An old title for the Chief minister of a southern Indian ruler, notably of: 
Under the Western Ganga Dynasty's Maharaja Dharma of Talakad (in modern Karnataka state), heading a cabinet which further included the Sandhivigrahi (Minister for dispute settlement), the Dandanayaka, the Commander-in-Chief of the armed forces, Srikaranadhikari (minister of Finance and Revenue), Manemagatine or Manevergade (Steward of the Royal household) and Hiriyabhandari (in charge of accounts and keeping of records); sometimes, the Purohita too found a place in this Council of Ministers, advising in matters of religion
The hereditary Chief Minister of Mysore; this was the office Tipu Sultan succeeded his father Hyder Ali and established a Muslim empire called Sarkar-e-Khudadad (God-gifted kingdom).
Superintendent, e.g. of a military camp
General manager of an enterprise

Sources
Platt's dictionary
Our Karnataka
IMDb

Heads of government
Titles in India
Kingdom of Mysore